Diana Maud McIntosh (March 4, 1932 Calgary, Alberta – Dec 22, 2022 Winnipeg, Manitoba) was a contemporary Canadian composer and pianist who was based in Winnipeg, Manitoba. Hailed by the Canadian Encyclopedia as "a champion of 20th-century Canadian music", she premiered piano works by such Canadian composers as Peter Allen (Logos, 1977), Norma Beecroft (Cantorum Vitae, 1981), Robert Daigneault (Corridors, Reminiscences, 1977), Alexina Louie (Pearls, 1980), Marjan Mozetich (Apparition 1985), Boyd McDonald (Fantasy, 1974), Jean Papineau-Couture (Les Arabesques d'Isabelle, 1990), Ann Southam (Four Bagatelles, 1964 & Integruities, 1973 & Inter-views, 1975), Robert Turner (Homage to Melville, 1974), and John Winiarz (Vortices, 1977). 

In 1977, she and Southam co-founded Music Inter Alia (MIA), a concert series of "contemporary music for people who don't like contemporary music". She served as the MIA's director until 1991.
 She was one of the founding artistic directors of the Winnipeg-based new music organization GroundSwell. 

McIntosh earned an associate degree from The Royal Conservatory of Music in 1957 and a Licentiate in Music in 1961. While there she was a pupil of Boris Roubakine. In 1972, she received a Bachelor of Music from the University of Manitoba where she was a pupil of Alma Brock-Smith and Robert Turner. She also studied with Adele Marcus at the Aspen Music Festival and School and privately in New York City. Her other teachers included Gladys Egbert (studies in Calgary), Leonard Isaacs (studies in Winnipeg), and Michael Colgrass (studies in Toronto).

Works
 Diana McIntosh Catalogue of Works

References

External links
Official Website of Diana McIntosh
Notice of passing

1937 births
Living people
Aspen Music Festival and School alumni
Canadian women pianists
Musicians from Calgary
The Royal Conservatory of Music alumni
University of Manitoba alumni
Women classical pianists
21st-century Canadian composers
21st-century Canadian pianists
21st-century women composers
Canadian women composers
21st-century Canadian women musicians
21st-century women pianists